Coccotrypes distinctus is a species of typical bark beetle in the family Curculionidae. It is known from Sri Lanka, Pacific Islands from New Guinea to Hawaii, southern USA, Honduras, Puerto Rico and Jamaica to Suriname and Guiana.

References

Further reading

 
 

Scolytinae
Beetles of Asia
Beetles of Central America
Beetles of North America
Beetles of Oceania
Beetles of South America
Beetles described in 1866
Taxa named by Victor Motschulsky
Articles created by Qbugbot